Studeno na Blokah is a small village west of Nova Vas in the Municipality of Bloke in the Inner Carniola region of Slovenia.

Name
Studeno na Blokah was attested in historical sources as Chaltenvelt in 1332 and Kaltenfeld in 1436, among other spellings. The name of the settlement was changed from Studeno to Studeno na Blokah in 1953.

Church
The local church, built just south of the settlement, is dedicated to John the Baptist and belongs to the Parish of Bloke.

References

External links

Studeno na Blokah on Geopedia

Populated places in the Municipality of Bloke